Peeping Tom was a British small press magazine that existed between 1990 and 2000.

History and profile
Peeping Tom was launched in 1990. It was initially published by David Bell and edited by Stuart Hughes (they later swapped roles). The magazine was published on a quarterly basis. The headquarters was in Leicestershire. It specialised in dark fantasy and horror, featuring such British authors as Joel Lane, Ian Watson, Derek Fox, D F Lewis, Nicholas Royle, Stephen Laws, Ramsey Campbell and Peter Tennant, as well as artwork by Dallas Goffin, Madeleine Finnegan, Chico Kidd, Gerald Gaubert and others. It received the British Fantasy Society Award for "best small press" in both 1992 and 1993. The magazine ceased publication in June 2000.

References

External links
 British Fantasy Society Awards - official listing
 Detailed index to issues #1-33, provided by Back Brain Recluse

Quarterly magazines published in the United Kingdom
Defunct literary magazines published in the United Kingdom
Horror fiction magazines
Magazines established in 1990
Magazines disestablished in 2000
Mass media in Leicestershire